Bedroom in Arles is the title given to each of three similar paintings by 19th-century Dutch Post-Impressionist painter Vincent van Gogh.

Van Gogh's own title for this composition was simply The Bedroom (French: La Chambre à coucher). There are three authentic versions described in his letters, easily distinguishable from one another by the pictures on the wall to the right.

The painting depicts van Gogh's bedroom at 2, Place Lamartine in Arles, Bouches-du-Rhône, France, known as the Yellow House. The door to the right opened on to the upper floor and the staircase; the door to the left was that of the guest room he held prepared for Gauguin; the window in the front wall looked on to Place Lamartine and its public gardens.
This room was not rectangular but trapezoid with an obtuse angle in the left hand corner of the front wall and an acute angle at the right.

First version

Van Gogh started the first version during mid October 1888 while staying in Arles, and explained his aims and means to his brother Theo:
"This time it simply reproduces my bedroom; but colour must be abundant in this part, its simplification adding a rank of grandee to the style applied to the objects, getting to suggest a certain rest or dream. Well, I have thought that on watching the composition we stop thinking and imagining. I have painted the walls pale violet. The ground with checked material. The wooden bed and the chairs, yellow like fresh butter; the sheet and the pillows, lemon light green. The bedspread, scarlet coloured. The window, green. The washbasin, orangey; the tank, blue. The doors, lilac. And, that is all. There is not anything else in this room with closed shutters. The square pieces of furniture must express unswerving rest; also the portraits on the wall, the mirror, the bottle, and some costumes. The white colour has not been applied to the picture, so its frame will be white, aimed to get me even with the compulsory rest recommended for me. I have depicted no type of shade or shadow; I have only applied simple plain colours, like those in crêpes."
Van Gogh included sketches of the composition in this letter as well as in a letter to Gauguin, written slightly later. In the letter, van Gogh explained that the painting had come out of a sickness that left him bedridden for days. This version has on the wall to the right miniatures of van Gogh's portraits of his friends Eugène Boch and Paul-Eugène Milliet.
The portrait of Eugène Boch is called The Poet and the portrait of Paul Eugène Milliet is called The Lover.

Second version
In April 1889, van Gogh sent the initial version to his brother regretting that it had been damaged by the flood of the Rhône while he was interned at the Old Hospital in Arles. Theo proposed to have it relined and sent back to him in order to copy it. This "repetition" in original scale (Van Gogh's term was "répetition") was executed in September 1889. Both paintings were then sent back to Theo.

Third version
In the summer of 1889, Van Gogh  decided to redo some of his "best" compositions in a smaller size (the term he used was réductions) for his mother and his sister Wil; The Bedroom was among the subjects he chose. These réductions, finished late in September 1889, are not exact copies.

In The Bedroom, the miniature portrait to the left recalls van Gogh's Peasant of Zundert self-portrait. The one to the right cannot be linked convincingly to any existing painting by van Gogh.

Provenance
 The first version never left the artist's estate. Since 1962, it has been in the possession of the Vincent van Gogh Foundation, established by Vincent Willem van Gogh, the artist's nephew, and on permanent loan to the Van Gogh Museum, Amsterdam.
 The second version has, since 1926, been the possession of the Art Institute of Chicago as part of the Helen Birch Bartlett Memorial Collection.
 The third version, formerly in the possession of Van Gogh's sister Wil and later acquired by Prince Matsukata, entered the French national collections in 1959, following the French-Japanese peace settlement, and is on permanent display in the Musée d'Orsay, Paris.
 All three versions of the Bedroom were brought together for an exhibition entitled Van Gogh's Bedrooms at the Art Institute of Chicago in 2016. The exhibition featured related works as well as a digital reconstruction of his bedroom.

References

External links

 The Bedroom on Google Art Project
 The Bedroom, Van Gogh Museum
 High resolution multimodal visualization of The Bedroom in Arles, the 3rd version at the Musée d'Orsay
 The Bedroom, The Vincent van Gogh Gallery
 Restoration completed on Van Gogh's Bedroom in Arles, Yahoo news, 2 September, 2010
 Antonino Saggio, The Bedroom by Vincent van Gogh: Symbols, Autobiographical Images and Perspective Distortions, "Disegnare" #.43 2011
 Bedroom in Arles (Van Gogh) – Video – Check123 Video Encyclopedia

Paintings of Arles by Vincent van Gogh
1888 paintings
1889 paintings
Paintings in the collection of the Art Institute of Chicago
Collections of the Van Gogh Museum
Paintings in the collection of the Musée d'Orsay